Pilosocereus pachycladus is a species of Pilosocereus found in Minas Gerais, Brazil.

Subspecies
 Pilosocereus pachycladus subsp. pachycladus
 Pilosocereus pachycladus subsp. pernambucoensis 
 Pilosocereus pachycladus subsp. viridis

References

External links

pachycladus
Flora of Brazil